Ronald Cohen, or Ron Cohen, may refer to:
 Ronald A. Cohen (born 1955), American neuropsychologist
 Ronald E. Cohen (born 1957), American geophysicist 
 Ronald L. Cohen, American social psychologist, focusing on justice
 Ronald M. Cohen (1939–1998), screenwriter and film producer 
 Sir Ronald Mourad Cohen, British multimillionaire venture capitalist and political figure
 Ron Cohen, composer